José Manuel Balbiani (born January 6, 1978) is an Argentine racing driver. He has run in different series, with major success in FIA GT Championship.

He was born in Buenos Aires.

External links
 Official website

Argentine racing drivers
FIA GT Championship drivers
TC 2000 Championship drivers
Racing drivers from Buenos Aires
British GT Championship drivers
Living people
1978 births
Blancpain Endurance Series drivers

Team Lazarus drivers
Nürburgring 24 Hours drivers
24H Series drivers
GT4 European Series drivers